RAML or Raml may refer to:

 RAML (software) (RESTful API Modeling Language), a YAML based language for describing RESTful APIs
 Michael Raml (born 1987), Austrian politician

See also
 Raml Zayta, a former Palestinian Arab village